Oroperipatus ecuadoriensis is a species of velvet worm in the Peripatidae family. The original description of this species is based on a female specimen notable for its large size (67 mm in length); this description also reports 39 pairs of legs. The type locality is in Ecuador.

References

Onychophorans of tropical America
Onychophoran species
Animals described in 1902